A lens mount is an interface – mechanical and often also electrical – between a photographic camera body and a lens. It is a feature of camera systems where the body allows interchangeable lenses, most usually the rangefinder camera, single lens reflex type, single lens mirrorless type or any movie camera of 16 mm or higher gauge. Lens mounts are also used to connect optical components in instrumentation that may not involve a camera, such as the modular components used in optical laboratory prototyping which join via C-mount or T-mount elements.

Mount types 
A lens mount may be a screw-threaded type, a bayonet-type, or a breech-lock (friction lock) type. Modern still camera lens mounts are of the bayonet type, because the bayonet mechanism precisely aligns mechanical and electrical features between lens and body.  Screw-threaded mounts are fragile and do not align the lens in a reliable rotational position, yet types such as the C-mount interface are still widely in use for other applications like video cameras and optical instrumentation.

Bayonet mounts generally have a number of tabs (often three) around the base of the lens, which fit into appropriately sized recesses in the lens mounting plate on the front of the camera. The tabs are often "keyed" in some way to ensure that the lens is only inserted in one orientation, often by making one tab a different size. Once inserted the lens is fastened by turning it a small amount. It is then locked in place by a spring-loaded pin, which can be operated to remove the lens.

Lens mounts of competing manufacturers (Sony, Nikon, Canon, Contax/Yashica, Pentax, etc.) are almost always incompatible.  In addition to the mechanical and electrical interface variations, the flange focal distance from the lens mount to the film or sensor can also be different.  Many allege that these incompatibilities are due to the desire of manufacturers to "lock in" consumers to their brand.

In movie cameras, the two most popular mounts in current usage on professional digital cinematography cameras are Arri's PL-mount and Panavision's PV-mount. The Panavision mounts are exclusively used with Panavision lenses, and thus are only available on Panaflex cameras or third-party cameras "Panavised" by a Panavision rental house, whereas the PL-mount style is favored with most other cameras and cine lens manufacturers. Both of these mounts are held in place with locating pins and friction locking rings. Other mounts which are now largely historical or a minority in relation to current practices are listed below.

List of lens mounts 
 

For small camera modules, used in e.g. CCTV systems and machine vision, a range of metric thread mounts exists. The smallest ones can be found also in e.g. cellphones and endoscopes. The most common by far is the M12x0.5, followed by M8x0.5 and M10x0.5.
 M4.2x0.2 (1/7" sensors)
 M4.6x0.25 (1/5", 2.4mm, 3.8mm sensors, industrial endoscopes)
 M5x0.35 (1/6", 1/5" sensors)
 M5.5x0.35 (1.7", 1/5.8", 1/5", 1/4" sensors)
 M6x0.35 (1/4", 5.2mm, 4.85mm sensors)
 M6.4x0.25 (1/3" sensors)
 M7x0.35 (1.8", 1.7", 1/6", 1/5", 1/4", 1/3.6", 1/3.2", 1/2.7", 4.85mm sensors)
 M8x0.35 (1/4", 1/3" sensors)
 M8x0.5 (1/5", 1/4", 1/3" sensors; sometimes occurs in diode laser modules)
 M9x0.5 (1/2.7", 1/3", 1/3.2" sensors; also commonly encountered in diode laser modules)
 M10x0.5 (1/4", 1/3" sensors)
 M12x0.5 (the S-mount, listed in the table)
 M22x0.5 (1/1.2" sensors)

Focusing lens mount

The axial adjustment range for focusing Ultra wide angle lenses and some Wide-angle lenses in large format cameras is usually very small.

So some manufacturers (e.g. Linhof) offered special focusing lens mounts, so-called wide-angle focusing accessories for their cameras.
With such a device, the lens could be focused precisely without moving the entire front standard.

Secondary lens mount

Secondary lens refers to a multi-element lens mounted either in front of a camera's primary lens, or in between the camera body and the primary lens.

(D)SLR camera & interchangeable-lens manufacturers offer lens accessories like extension tubes and secondary lenses like teleconverters, which mount in between the camera body and the primary lens, both using and providing a primary lens mount. Various lensmakers also offer optical accessories that mount in front of the lens; these may include wide-angle, telephoto, fisheye, and close-up or macro adapters.

Canon PowerShot A and Canon PowerShot G cameras have a built-in or non-interchangeable primary (zoom) lens, and Canon has "conversion tube" accessories available for some Canon PowerShot camera models which provide either a 52mm or 58mm "accessory/filter" screw thread.  Canon's close-up, wide- (WC-DC), and tele-conversion (TC-DC) lenses have 2, 3, and 4-element lenses respectively, so they are multi-element lenses and not diopter "filters".

Lens mount adapters

Lens mount adapters are designed to attach a lens to a camera body with non-matching mounts. Generally, a lens can be easily adapted to a camera body with a smaller flange focal distance by simply adding space between the camera and the lens. When attempting to adapt a lens to a camera body with a larger flange focal distance, the adapter must include a secondary lens in order to compensate. This has the side effect of decreasing the amount of light that reaches the sensor, as well as adding a crop factor to the lens. Without the secondary lens, these adapters will function as an extension tube and will not be able to focus to infinity.

See also 
ISO metric screw thread
Lens board

Notes 

4/3's published facts:
It is half that of 35-mm film format ( x  = )  The image circle of the interchangeable lens is specified based on this diagonal length. The focal length is about a half that of a 135 film camera lens assuming the same angle of view."
"The foundation for the high picture quality of the Four Thirds system is the lens mount, which is about twice the diameter of the image circle."
"Differences between Four Thirds System mount and Micro Four Thirds System mount:   Mount diameter reduction; As a result of research aimed at facilitating the design of compact, lightweight lenses while maintaining the current strength, the outer diameter of the lens mount has been reduced by approx. . ... the Micro Four Thirds System ... specifies the optimum flange back length required to reduce camera size and thickness, assuming the omission of the mirror box.  The flange back length has been reduced to about 1/2 that of the Four Thirds System."

So:
21.63mm * 2 =  or ~44mm
43.26mm – 6mm =  or ~38mm
;  See: Pythagorean theorem

NOTE:
Some published reviews of 4/3 instead cite the (female) "outside diameter" of the lens or mount as ~50mm (and micro-4/3 as ~44mm), and not the appropriate major diameter (D) ~44mm which is the camera body's female mount inside-diameter and the lens's male mount outside-diameter (micro-4/3 ~38mm).

References

Sources

External links
 SLR Mount Identification Guide
 List of Camera, Mount Type and Register for Mechanical & Optical Instruments
 https://web.archive.org/web/20081221083400/http://medfmt.8k.com/, Camera mounts & registers from Robert Monahan Medium Format Photography Megasite
 http://www.markerink.org/WJM/HTML/mounts.htm, Camera mounts & registers from Willem-Jan Markerink
 Camera Mounts Sorted by Register
 Alphabetical List of Camera Mounts
 Nikon Lens Nomenclature – a study in frustration
 Adaptall-2.com
 DPReview Hands-on preview of Fujifilm X-Pro1
 DPreview Hands-on preview of Canon EOS M
 Standard: GOST 10332-72 (in Russian) – M42×1/45.5, M39×1/28.8
 Standard: GOST 10332-63 (in Russian) – M39×1/45.2 (aka «Z39»), M39×1/28.8, bayonet «C» (cameras: «Zenit-5», «Zenit-6», «Zenit-7»), bayonet «Zenit-7» (in Russian)